South Indian Film Chamber of Commerce, abbreviated as SIFCC, is a South Indian film producers, distributors and exhibitors association, headquartered in Chennai, Tamil Nadu, India.  It consists of the Telugu Film Chamber of Commerce, Karnataka Film Chamber of Commerce, Kerala Film Chamber of Commerce and the Tamil Nadu Film Chamber of Commerce. The SIFCC was inaugurated in 1938. The current president of the organisation is Prasad Katragadda. The SIFCC is an active supporter of the Chennai International Film Festival.

References

Film organisations in India
Organisations based in Tamil Nadu
1938 establishments in India
Organizations established in 1938